is a 2000 Japanese film directed by Tetsuo Shinohara.

Cast
 Rena Tanaka
 Hiroyuki Sanada
 Mieko Harada
 Mitsuru Hirata
 Makoto Satō
 Masaki Nishina
 Nori Horikoshi
 Uchiyama Jikko
 Yōji Tanaka

Reception
It was chosen as the 3rd Best Film at the 22nd Yokohama Film Festival.

References

External links

Films directed by Tetsuo Shinohara
2000s Japanese films